Poetic Justice is a Singaporean Chinese-language drama television series. It depicts the lives of a group of people doing investigative journalism, and was telecasted on Singapore's free-to-air channel, MediaCorp Channel 8. It stars Rui En, Dai Xiangyu, Rebecca Lim & Desmond Tan as the casts of the series. It was broadcast on MediaCorp Channel 8 from 11 September 2012 to 8 October 2012. This drama serial consists of 20 episodes, and was screened on every weekday night at 9:00 pm.

Unlike most locally produced series about crime, this series departs from the traditional police procedural style and focuses more on investigative journalism and the media.

Story
The plot revolves around a group of young professionals involved in investigative journalism. Two journalists team up with a wealthy businessman and a lawyer to help solve cases for those in need. As they investigate further, they uncover more secrets and dark truths behind some of the crimes.

Cast

Main Cast

 Rui En as Liu Yanzhi 刘言之:A reporter and anchorwoman at Real TV.
 Dai Xiangyu as Fang Zhengye:A reporter at Real TV.
 Rebecca Lim as Feng Luoling 冯洛凌:A reporter and anchorwoman at Real TV.
 Desmond Tan as Tang Zhisheng 唐智胜:A lawyer and legal consultant of Real TV

Supporting Cast

Cameo Appearance

Production
Filming for Poetic Justice took place from June to August 2012. This is the first show where Rui En and Dai Xiangyu collaborate as the main leads in a television drama.

Originally, this television drama was entitled Fair? Unfair? in English.

Awards & Nominations

See also
 List of programmes broadcast by Mediacorp Channel 8
 List of Poetic Justice episodes

References

External links
 Poetic Justice on Facebook
 Poetic Justice on MediaCorp's corporate website

Singapore Chinese dramas
2012 Singaporean television series debuts
Channel 8 (Singapore) original programming